SANE is a UK mental health charity working to improve quality of life for people affected by mental illness.

History

SANE was established in 1986 to improve the quality of life for people affected by mental illness, following the overwhelming public response to a series of articles published in The Times entitled "The Forgotten Illness". Written by the charity's founder and Chief Executive, Marjorie Wallace, the articles exposed the neglect of people suffering from mental illness and the poverty of services and information for individuals and families. From its initial focus on schizophrenia (the name started as an acronym for "Schizophrenia: A National Emergency"), SANE expanded and is now concerned with all mental illnesses.

During the COVID-19 pandemic lockdowns, SANE's hotline received a 200% increase in calls.

See also
Centre for Mental Health
Improving Access to Psychological Therapies
Mental Health Foundation
Mental Health Providers' Forum
Mind
Nacro
Rethink Mental Illness
Richmond Fellowship
Revolving Doors Agency
Stand to Reason (charity)
Together
Turning Point

General:
 Mental health in the United Kingdom

References

Health charities in the United Kingdom
Health in the London Borough of Islington
Mental health organisations in the United Kingdom
Organisations based in the London Borough of Islington